Isotoma hypocrateriformis,  commonly known as Woodbridge poison, is a small herbaceous perennial in the family Campanulaceae native to Western Australia.

It blooms between September and January producing white-blue-purple-pink flowers.

It is found in a variety of habitats in the South West, Wheatbelt and Great Southern regions of Western Australia where it grows in sandy soils around granite.

References

hypocrateriformis
Flora of Western Australia
Plants described in 1917